Trần Công Minh  is a Vietnamese footballer who plays as a midfielder for V.League 2 club Đồng Tháp.

In 2016, Công Minh was the best player at the Vietnamese National U-17 Football Championship, scoring the goals and making big contributions to U-17 Đồng Tháp winning the championship after defeating U-17 PVF in the match final. Two years prior, at the Vietnamese National U-15 Football Championship, Công Minh scored the opening goal for U-15 Đồng Tháp to overcome U-15 PVF in the final to win the championship.

Honours

Club
Đồng Tháp
 U-19 Championship: 2018
 U-17 Championship: 2016

Individual
 Best player of Vietnamese National U-17 Football Championship: 2016
 Best player of Vietnamese National U-19 Football Championship: 2018
 Top scorer  of Vietnamese National U-19 Football Championship: 2018

References

Dong Thap FC players
Association football midfielders
Vietnamese footballers
Living people
1999 births